Eddie Yue Wai-man (born 21 September 1964), JP, is the 3rd and current Chief Executive of the Hong Kong Monetary Authority, having held the position since 1 October 2019.

He graduated from Chinese University of Hong Kong, University of London, and Harvard Business School.

In September 2022, Yue said that when inviting executives to Hong Kong for the Global Financial Leaders' Investment Summit in November 2022, "Nobody asked about quarantine restrictions [then], or any arrangements needed to come to Hong Kong." In contrast, earlier reports said that executives told the Hong Kong government they would be reluctant to travel if hotel quarantine was required, or if any other restrictions remained in place. Yue said that their attendance to the Summit was a vote of confidence for the city. On 27 October 2022, Yue said that he hoped the public would understand letting the guests to the Summit be exempt from normal COVID-19 restrictions, where other arrivals to Hong Kong cannot eat at restaurants in the first 3 days after landing in the city. Despite the COVID-19 exemptions for the guests, Yue said "Hong Kong is back."

References

1965 births
Living people
Hong Kong chief executives
21st-century Hong Kong people
Alumni of the Chinese University of Hong Kong
Alumni of the University of London
Harvard Business School alumni